The Escalante Route is a hiking trail on the South Rim of the Grand Canyon National Park, located in the U.S. state of Arizona. It starts near the Tanner Rapids (Tanner Graben) on the Colorado River and follows the river. It also passes by Escalante Creek and ends near the Hance Rapids.
It falls into the lowest maintenance category ("route") of the Grand Canyon trails which means it is essentially unmaintained. There is a 30-feet cliff located near the Hance Rapids, popularly known as the Papago Wall, which needs to be climbed. The National Park Service advises to bring a rope for backpacks. There are several other easy, yet avoidable climbing opportunities in 75 Mile Canyon, some of which have been marked by cairns.

See also
 List of Colorado River rapids and features
 The Grand Canyon
 List of trails in Grand Canyon National Park

External links
 Escalante Route National Park Service factsheet.
 Trip Report Resource with pictures and maps of the Escalante Route

Hiking trails in Grand Canyon National Park